Holy Murder Masquerade is an album by Swedish band Impious. It was released on February 6, 2007,  through Metal Blade Records.

Track listing
 "The Confession" 
 "Bound To Bleed (For A Sacred Need)" 
 "T.P.S." 
 "Bloodcraft" 
 "Holy Murder Masquerade" 
 "Death On Floor 44" 
 "Slaughtertown Report" 
 "Three Of One" 
 "Everlasting Punishment" 
 "Purified By Fire" 
 "Dark Closure"

2007 albums
Impious albums